The 2021 Rome ePrix was a pair of Formula E electric car races held at the Circuito Cittadino dell'EUR in the EUR residential and business district of the Italian capital of Rome on 10 and 11 April 2021. It marked the third and fourth rounds of the 2020–21 Formula E season, as well as the third running of the event. The first race was won by Jean-Éric Vergne, with Sam Bird and Mitch Evans rounding out the podium. Stoffel Vandoorne won the second race, ahead of Alexander Sims and Pascal Wehrlein.

Classification

Race one

Qualifying

Notes:
  – Maximilian Günther received a 5-place grid penalty for causing a collision in the previous race at Diriyah.
  – Tom Blomqvist received a 3-place grid penalty for entering the fast lane too early during qualifying.
  – Oliver Turvey was penalised with a pit lane start for causing a collision dangerously at the end of free practice 1.

Race

Notes:
  – Fastest lap.
  – Fastest in group stage.
  – Pole position.
  – André Lotterer and Nick Cassidy received a 5-second time penalty each for causing a collision.
  – Sérgio Sette Câmara received a post-race 5-second time penalty for speeding under full course yellow.
  – Oliver Turvey did not start the race as his team could not rebuild his car in time following his free practice shunt.

Standings after the race

Drivers' Championship standings

Teams' Championship standings

 Notes: Only the top five positions are included for both sets of standings.

Race two

Qualifying

Notes:
  – As Oliver Turvey did not start race one, his pit lane start penalty was applied in race two.

Race

Notes:
  – Fastest lap.
  – Pole position.
  – Fastest in group stage.
  – Sébastien Buemi received a 5-second time penalty for causing a collision.
  – Oliver Rowland received a 10-second time penalty for causing a collision.
  – Lynn, Frijns and Cassidy all received a post-race drive-through penalty converted into a 30-second time penalty for failing to activate the third of the three mandatory attack modes. Frijns also received a further 5-second time penalty for a safety car infringement.
  – Norman Nato originally finished third, but was disqualified from the race due to his energy used being over the regulatory limit.

Standings after the race

Drivers' Championship standings

Teams' Championship standings

 Notes: Only the top five positions are included for both sets of standings.

Notes

References

|- style="text-align:center"
|width="35%"|Previous race:2021 Diriyah ePrix
|width="30%"|FIA Formula E World Championship2020–21 season
|width="35%"|Next race:2021 Valencia ePrix
|- style="text-align:center"
|width="35%"|Previous race:2019 Rome ePrix
|width="30%"|Rome ePrix
|width="35%"|Next race:2022 Rome ePrix
|- style="text-align:center"

2021
2020–21 Formula E season
2021 in Italian motorsport
April 2021 sports events in Italy